Alexander II of Alexandria may refer to:

 Pope Alexander II of Alexandria, Coptic patriarch in 702–729
 Patriarch Alexander II of Alexandria, Greek patriarch in 1059–1062